Auraria (foaled 1892) was an Australian racehorse that won the 1895 Melbourne Cup.

Racing career

Auraria was bred at St Albans stud in Victoria and bought for 280 guineas by David James of Kapunda.

She raced 10 times as a two-year-old for six wins, three seconds and a fourth.

As a three-year-old she had only seven starts, winning the Melbourne Cup, South Australian Derby, VRC Oaks and the Fisher Plate (dead heat with Wallace). Her other results were third in the Victoria Derby to Wallace and Osculator just three days before her Melbourne Cup win and two fourths. Her final race was the 1897 Fisher Plate when she finished last in the field of four.

Stud career 
Auraria was bred to Pistol and produced several leading broodmares, including Princess Aura and Little Joan.

References

Melbourne Cup winners
1892 racehorse births
Racehorses trained in Australia